Albino González y Menédez Reigada (Corias, Cangas del Tineo, Asturias, Spain, January 18, 1881 – Córdoba, August 13, 1958) was a Spanish ecclesiastic and the seventh Bishop of the Roman Catholic Diocese of San Cristóbal de La Laguna and later the Bishop of the Diocese of Cordova.

Episcopate 
He was named the bishop of Tenerife on December 8, 1924, by Pope Pius XI.

He was consecrated in Madrid on July 19, 1925. On August 10, 1925, he entered the diocese.

During his pontificate, on June 7, 1941, Cardinal Federico Tedeschini solemnly crowned the Image of the Virgin of Las Nieves, Patron of the Island of La Palma. He expanded the seminary building. He created the Minor seminary in 1944. He ordained 48 diocesan priests. He served the diocese for twenty years until his transfer to the Diocese of Cordova.

Politic attitude 
Coinciding with Franco when he was assigned to the Canary Islands, after the civil war, in 1939, he wrote the Catecismo patriótico Español, in which he apologizes for national Catholicism, qualifies Catalan as a dialect, and promoved the catalan linguistic secessionism:    -It can be said that in Spain only the Castilian language is spoken, because apart from this only Basque is spoken which, as the only language, is only used in some Basque villages and was reduced to dialect functions for its linguistic and philological poverty.

    -And what are the main dialects spoken in Spain?

    -The main dialects spoken in Spain are four: Catalan, Valencian, Mallorcan and Galician.This indoctrination manual approved by Franco's Ministry of National Education and with an anti-Semitic and anti-democratic rhetoric, was withdrawn as a textbook in schools from 1945, coinciding with the defeat of the Axis powers.

References

External links 
 Personal file in Catholic hierarchy. 

1881 births
1958 deaths
Roman Catholic bishops of San Cristóbal de La Laguna
Bishops of Córdoba
20th-century Roman Catholic bishops in Spain